The men's decathlon event at the 2003 European Athletics U23 Championships was held in Bydgoszcz, Poland, at Zawisza Stadion on 17 and 18 July.

Medalists

Results

Final
17-18 July

Participation
According to an unofficial count, 19 athletes from 13 countries participated in the event.

 (1)
 (1)
 (2)
 (2)
 (3)
 (2)
 (1)
 (1)
 (1)
 (1)
 (1)
 (1)
 (2)

References

Decathlon
Combined events at the European Athletics U23 Championships